The Sheriff of Hope Eternal is a 1921 American silent Western film directed by Ben F. Wilson and starring Jack Hoxie, Marin Sais and Joseph W. Girard.

Synopsis
A stage coach driver Drew Halliday falls in love with Hela Marcale when she returns West from finishing school. After he defends her from an aggressive saloon owner and gambler, he is elected sheriff.

Cast
 Jack Hoxie as Drew Halliday
 Marin Sais as Hela Marcale
 Joseph W. Girard as 'Silk' Lowry 
 William Dyer as Judge Clayton
 Bee Monson as Marybelle Sawyer
 Theodore Brown as Her Father
 Wilbur McGaugh as Her Brother

References

Bibliography
 Munden, Kenneth White. The American Film Institute Catalog of Motion Pictures Produced in the United States, Part 1. University of California Press, 1997.

External links
 

1921 films
1921 Western (genre) films
1920s English-language films
Films directed by Ben F. Wilson
Arrow Film Corporation films
Silent American Western (genre) films
1920s American films